Nubar also written Noubar may refer to:

Places

Persons
Nubar, variant Noubar, an Armenian given name (Նուբար in Armenian or Նուպար in Western Armenian)

Nubar Pasha (1825–1899), Egyptian politician and the first Prime Minister of Egypt of Ottoman Armenian descent
Boghos Nubar Pasha (1851–1930), Chairman of the Armenian National Assembly, liberal leader, the founder of the Armenian General Benevolent Union (AGBU), son of Egyptian Prime Minister Nubar Pasha
Zareh Nubar, son of Boghos Nubar, and grandson of the Egyptian Prime Minister Nubar Pasha
Nubar Alexanian, American Armenian documentary photographer
Nubar Gulbenkian (1896–1972), Armenian business magnate and socialite born in the Ottoman Empire
Nubar Terziyan (1909–1994), born Nubar Alyanak, Turkish Armenian actor